Roman Popov may refer to:
 Roman Popov (footballer), Ukrainian footballer
 Roman Popov (ice hockey), Russian ice hockey player